Thea Mørk (born 5 April 1991) is a retired Norwegian female handball player, who last played for København Håndbold.

Mørk announced her retirement from handball in December 2018 at the age of 27. She struggled with many injuries throughout her career.

Achievements
Norwegian Championship:
Winner: 2010/2011, 2011/2012, 2012/2013, 2013/2014, 2014/2015, 2015/2016, 2016/2017
Silver medalist: 2017/2018
Norwegian Cup:
Winner: 2010, 2011, 2012, 2013, 2014, 2015, 2016

Individual awards
 All-Star Left Wing of Grundigligaen: 2016/2017
 All-Star Left Wing of Eliteserien: 2017/2018

Personal life
She is a twin sister of Nora Mørk.

References

Norwegian female handball players
1991 births
Living people
Handball players from Oslo
Norwegian expatriate sportspeople in Denmark
Expatriate handball players
Twin sportspeople
Norwegian twins